Psathi is a small settlement in Ios, Greece. It is located 8 km from Chora, the capital of Ios and 200 km from Athens.

Archaeological Significance

According to Government Gazette No.161 B of 1995, the location shown on the map is considered an archaeological site. That decision was taken in order to preserve the remains of two ancient temples where today on top of them are built two churches, the remains of a Roman aqueduct and the remains of an ancient, proto-cycladic settlement and cemetery.

References

Populated places in Ios